Erik Pedersen (born 1955) is a former Norwegian ice hockey player. He was born in Fredrikstad and played for the club Stjernen Hockey. He played for the Norwegian national ice hockey team at the 1980 Winter Olympics.

References

External links

1955 births
Living people
Sportspeople from Fredrikstad
Norwegian ice hockey players
Olympic ice hockey players of Norway
Ice hockey players at the 1980 Winter Olympics